Suleiman Abdurrahaman also known as Kawu Sumaila (OFR) (born 3 March 1968) is a Nigerian politician, businessman, and former Senior Special Assistant to President Muhammadu Buhari on National Assembly House of Representatives Matters. He is currently the senator-elect for Nigeria's Kano South Senatorial District on the New Nigerian People Party. He served three terms in the Nigerian House of Representatives and was the Deputy Minority Leader of the 6th and 7th Houses of Representatives. He was a member of the All Progressive Congress(APC) and sat on the board of trustees, National Caucus, and NEC, as well as the central merger committee that founded the APC.

Early life and education
Hon. Kawu Sumaila was born on 3 March 1968 in Sumaila Village in Kano State to Alhaji Abdurrahaman Tadu and Hajiya Maryam Muhammad.

He attended Sumaila Gabas Primary School, Sumaila, in Kano State, where he obtained his first School Leaving Certificate in 1976 and Senior Secondary School, Sumaila, where he obtained Secondary School Leaving Certificate in 1988. He proceeded to Bayero University Kano, where he obtained a Diploma and an Advance Diploma in Educational Management. He was a student of the National Open University of Nigeria (NOUN) where he obtained Bachelor of Arts in Islamic Studies, he was also a student in Nigerian Defence Academy where he obtained masters in leadership studies ,he was also a student in Bayero university Kano(BUK) where he obtained masters in developmental studies. Kawu SUMAILA possesses a masters degree in political science from Maryam Abacha University. Niger Republic ,And he possess PhD in Political Science from Al-Qalam University Katsina.

Kawu Sumaila attended short courses and obtained certificates at Harvard University (US) Oxford University (UK)Cambridge University (UK) Bayero University (Kano),

Professional affiliations
Hon Kawu Sumaila was appointed as a member of the Kano State Library Board, Coordinator of National Poverty Eradication Programme (NAPEP) and Chairman Local Government Monitoring Committee of the programme, Sumaila L.G.A.

Political career
Kawu Sumaila joined politics in 1991. He was a member of the Social Democratic Party (SDP), Member Peoples Democratic Movement (PDM), which later merged with some other political groups in the country to form what is today known as the People's Democratic Party (PDP). Kawu served as Deputy State  Organizing Secretary and Kano state house of assembly aspirant of PDM and PDP in 1995 and 1999 subsequently. During Sani Abacha transition programme. Hon Kawu was a member of United Nigeria Congress Party (UNCP).

In 2003, Hon Kawu Sumaila decamped to All Nigeria Peoples Party (ANPP) and contested as member of House of Representatives representing Sumaila/Takai Federal Constituency where he served in various committees including  Water resources, Interior, Information, Poverty Alleviation and NEMA before he became the Deputy Minority Leader in 2007 after his re-election for the second term into the Lower Chamber. In 2011, Hon Kawu Sumaila was re-elected in to the House and was later retained his position as Deputy Minority Leader. He served as a member of constitutional amendment committee between 2007-2011 and 2011-2015 and also served as member Governing Council of National Institute of Legislative Studies (NILS).

Having successfully completed three consecutive terms in the House of Representatives of the National Assembly, Hon Kawu Sumaila contested for position of the Executive Governor of Kano State under the platform of All Progressive Congress (APC).
after that In August 2016 president Muhammadu Buhari  appointed Hon Kawu Sumaila as his senior Special assistant on National Assembly matters.

Political achievements
Kawu Sumaila has developed and achieved his political career by proving his legislative mettle to sponsor important bills and motions that have reshaped the nation. These include amendment of Section 145 of the Constitution which provided for transfer of power to the Vice President and Deputy Governor; State Assembly financial autonomy; extrajudicial killings in Maiduguri by security agencies; dilapidated condition of Kano Airport; illegal parking of articulated trucks at Tafa village; control and management of cerebrovascular meningitis; setting time limit to dispose-off election petitions before swearing-in elected officers. Recruitment in Federal Airport Authority of Nigeria (FAAN), violation of Federal Character, Poor implementation of budget 2013, and $9.7M Dollars Saga (South Africa), and much more.

Honours and awards
Kawu Sumaila has a Traditional Title of Turakin Sumaila conferred to him by the late Dan Isan Kano, District Head of Sumaila in 2006. He was also conferred of the prestigious national honour of the Order of the Federal Republic of Nigeria (OFR) in September 2012 by President Goodluck Jonathan.

References

Kano State
Members of the House of Representatives (Nigeria)
Politicians from Kano State
Living people
1968 births
All Progressives Congress politicians
Nigerian Muslims